Paul Fentz (born 8 September 1992) is a retired German figure skater. He has won four senior international medals and is a four-time German national champion (2018–20, 2022). He has competed in the final segment at eight ISU Championships.

Career 
Fentz began appearing on the ISU Junior Grand Prix series in the 2008–09 season. His senior international debut came at the 2011 Triglav Trophy.

In the 2011–12 season, he won the silver medal at the 2012 German Championships and was included in Germany's team to the 2012 European Championships in Sheffield, England. After advancing past the preliminary round, he placed 23rd in the short program, 15th in the free skate, and 17th overall.

Fentz won his first senior international medal in February 2013, obtaining bronze at the Bavarian Open and then silver at the Hellmut Seibt Memorial.

Ranked 16th in the short and 17th in the free, Fentz finished 16th at the 2016 European Championships in Bratislava, Slovakia. He placed 12th in the short, 8th in the free, and 10th overall at the 2017 European Championships in Ostrava, Czech Republic. In March, he finished 20th at the 2017 World Championships in Helsinki, Finland. Due to his result, Germany qualified for a spot in the men's event at the 2018 Winter Olympics in Pyeongchang, South Korea.

Fentz was unable to qualify for the men's event at the 2022 Winter Olympics four years later, but he participated as the German entry in the men's short program of the Olympic team event, where he finished ninth of nine skaters.

Programs

Competitive highlights
GP: Grand Prix; CS: Challenger Series; JGP: Junior Grand Prix

References

 2009 German Junior Men's Figure Skating Championships
 2007 German Youth Men's Figure Skating Championships

External links

  
 
 Paul Fentz at Tracings.net
 
 

German male single skaters
1992 births
Living people
Figure skaters from Berlin
Figure skaters at the 2018 Winter Olympics
Figure skaters at the 2022 Winter Olympics
Olympic figure skaters of Germany